The 1940 Wyoming Cowboys football team represented the University of Wyoming in the Mountain States Conference (MSC) during the 1940 college football season.  In its first and only season under head coach Okie Blanchard, the team compiled a 1–7–1 record (0–5–1 against MSC opponents) and was outscored by a total of 190 to 32.

Schedule

References

Wyoming
Wyoming Cowboys football seasons
Wyoming Cowboys football